Edward Cooper may refer to:

 Edward Cooper (West Virginia politician) (1873–1928), West Virginia congressman
 Edward Cooper (mayor) (1824–1905), mayor of New York City 1879–1880
 Edward Cooper (VC) (1896–1985), British recipient of the Victoria Cross
 Edward Cooper (actor) (1883–1956), British actor
 Edward Cooper (pilot boat), New York pilot boat
 Edward Elder Cooper (1859–1908), 19th century black journalist and publisher in the U.S.
 Edward H. Cooper, law professor at the University of Michigan Law School; civil procedure and jurisdiction scholar 
 Edward Cooper, real name of Dancing Harry, featured at Madison Square Garden in the early 1970s for all New York Knicks home games
 Edward Synge Cooper (1762–1830), Member of the UK Parliament for County Sligo 1806–22
 Edward Joshua Cooper (1798–1863), Irish astronomer and politician, Member of the UK Parliament for Sligo County 1830–41 and  1857–59
 Edward Cooper (British Army officer) (1858–1945), commander of the 58th (2/1st London) Division in the First World War
 Edward Henry Cooper (1827–1902), Member of the UK Parliament for County Sligo 1865–68
 Ed Cooper (born 1960), retired Canadian professional ice hockey forward
 Ed Cooper (politician), member of the Wyoming Senate
 Ted Cooper (1920–1999), American television set designer, producer and consultant

See also
 Edward Ashley-Cooper (1906–2000), actor
 Eddie Cooper (disambiguation)